The United States government first recognized the usefulness of foreign aid as a tool of diplomacy in World War II. It was believed that it would promote liberal capitalist models of development in other countries and that it would enhance national security.

The United States is the largest contributor of military aid to foreign countries in the world, with its Department of Defense providing funding and/or American military hardware aid to over 150 countries annually for defense purposes.

Military funding programs

There are three main programs where military funding is allocated:

Foreign military financing provides grants for the acquisition of U.S. defense equipment, services, and training. These grants enable friends and allies to improve their defense capabilities. FMF is allowed under the Arms Export Control Act (AECA), which as amended [22 U.S.C. 2751, et. seq.], authorizes the President to finance procurement of defense articles and services for foreign countries and international organizations. The goals of FMF are:
 Promoting national security by contributing to regional and global stability
 Strengthening military support for democratically elected governments and containing transnational threats, including terrorism and trafficking in narcotics, weapons, and persons
 Fostering closer military relationships between the U.S. and recipient nations
Peacekeeping Operations (PKO) provide voluntary support for international peacekeeping activities. These funds support non-U.N. operations and training in response to a nation’s crisis. The goals of PKO are:
 Promoting increased involvement of regional organizations in conflict resolution
 Helping leverage support for multinational efforts in the event of a nation's crisis
The International Military Education and Training program (IMET) offers military training on a grant basis to foreign military officials. The goals of IMET are:
 Encouraging effective defense relationships
 Promoting interoperability with U.S. and coalition forces
 Exposing foreign civilian and military officials to democratic values, military professionalism, and international norms of human rights

Some examples of this would include the United States' efforts in Colombia and South Korea. Military aid has been successful in stopping insurgency, providing stability, and ending conflicts within the region. In South Korea, US military aid has been beneficial for the maintenance of national security, economic and social development, and civilization as a whole.

In many other cases, military aid has laid the groundwork for other forms of aid. This aid includes building schools to promote education, providing clean drinking water, and further stabilizing food production. Without military aid, this development would have been impossible.

Criticisms

Particular targets of criticism include
 Funds appropriated to the State Department and Defense Department represent the vast majority of unclassified military aid and assistance. The public does not have any way of tracking classified programs administered by the U.S. intelligence community.
 Foreign aid often aids the giver, not the recipient.
 Corruption is a major problem. Funds often go directly to leaders who may not share the aid with citizens.
 The United States gives the same amount of money to its top five aid recipients as they give to the rest of the world.
 Military aid went to Latin American dictatorships in the second half of the 20th century.
Generally, increasing levels of US military aid significantly reduces cooperative foreign policy behavior with the United States

See also
 Military budget of the United States
 United States Foreign Military Financing
 United States Agency for International Development
 Foreign policy of the United States
 Criticism of U.S. foreign policy
 United States security assistance to the Palestinian National Authority
 Israel–United States military relations

References

External links
 Fiscal Year 2008 Budget Request: International Affairs (PDF), U.S. Congress.
 Congressional Budget Justification: Foreign Operations (PDF), Fiscal year 2008, U.S. Congress.
 Foreign Aid Explorer U.S. Agency for International Development.
 Where Does U.S. Military Aid Go? (1946-2010), PBS

 
Military industry
United States federal budgets
United States foreign aid
Military diplomacy